Patrick Charles Carnegy, 15th Earl of Northesk (born 23 September 1940), is a British hereditary peer, journalist and scholar.

Carnegy was educated at Rugby School and Trinity Hall, Cambridge, matriculating in 1960. His books include Faust as Musician: A Study of Thomas Mann’s novel ‘Doctor Faustus’ (1973) and Wagner and the Art of the Theatre (2006, Royal Philharmonic Soc Award, Special Jury Prize George Freedley Memorial Award), which took 40 years to write. Other publications include reviews and articles on German literature, music, opera (especially Wagner) and theatre for The Times Literary and Educational Supplements, the London Review of Books, The Spectator, Opera, The Musical Times, and other journals.

As a broadcaster he was a regular contributor in the 1970s and 1980s to BBC Radio 4's arts magazine Kaleidoscope. Contributions to Radio 3 have included documentaries on Thomas Mann, Kafka, the Barenboim/Kupfer Ring at Bayreuth (1988), and the first assessment of the Ring on DVD for CD Review (2008) Radio 3's CD Review. For television he contributed to BBC 2's documentary film Wagner in the Great Composers series (1998).

In 1988 he was invited by Jeremy Isaacs to create the post of Dramaturg (literary and repertory adviser) at the Royal Opera House. There he initiated a programme of lectures, study days and other events open to all. He was awarded a Leverhulme Research Fellowship (1994–1996).

He was a founding member of the Bayreuth International Arts Centre and served on the BBC Central Music Advisory Committee (1986–1989) and on the BBC General Advisory Council (1990–1996).

Lord Northesk is an agnatic descendant of David Carnegie, 2nd Earl of Northesk. He inherited the earldom on the death of his eighth cousin once removed, David Carnegie, 14th Earl of Northesk, on 28 March 2010.

Lord Northesk lives with his wife, soprano Jill Gomez, in Cambridgeshire.

References

1940 births
Living people
People educated at Rugby School
Alumni of Trinity Hall, Cambridge
Patrick
British music critics